The 1918 East Tyrone by-election was held on 3 April 1918.  The by-election was held due to the resignation of the incumbent Irish Parliamentary Party MP, William Redmond.  It was won by the Irish Parliamentary candidate Thomas Harbison.

Redmond had resigned in order to contest the Waterford City by-election which had become vacant when his father, John Redmond, had died.  The Sinn Féin candidate was Seán Milroy.  The by-election was the last in a short string of by-elections where it seemed that the more moderate nationalists were regaining ground from Sinn Féin before being virtually wiped out in the 1918 Irish general election.

References

1918 elections in the United Kingdom
By-elections to the Parliament of the United Kingdom in County Tyrone constituencies
20th century in County Tyrone
1918 elections in Ireland